The Quark Publishing System (QPS) was a collaborative workflow management system first released in 1991 by Quark, Inc. and now superseded by Quark Publishing Platform. It allowed the creators of large publications to manage the process by which the publications are created, and also track the flow of created materials through the various phases of creation, editing, review, combination, and printing. It was mostly used by the producers of periodical publications like magazines, newspapers and catalog but also occasionally used for producing complicated one-off publications like books and advertising materials.

System
QPS Classic was a cross-platform workgroup publishing solution that streamlines workflow and provides tools to manage workloads. It incorporated a central repository for content with modules for file management, file locking, monitoring, tracking, version control, revision management, page design, and copyediting. One large innovation/advantage of the system was that QPS allowed layout artists and editors to work at the same document at the same time.

The system was configurable by end users/administrators and IT professionals with a fairly modest amount of training. It was very flexible and became more stable since having been launched, in 2004, as a Mac OS X product. Previous versions of QPS were notorious for various bugs and crashes that required strict adherence to certain procedures and maintenance.

QPS was first released in 1991 by Quark, Inc. after having been beta-tested at BusinessWeek and M&T Publishing on DBMS Magazine in the late 1980s. The product was long considered the market leader with over 900 sites worldwide and over 50,000 seats sold. For the first decade of its existence, QPS was more-or-less without competitors. Although some companies did offer similarly conceived workflow systems, most of those were designed/developed with the newspaper market in mind.

QPS latterly supported Mac, Web and Windows Clients, editors could use QuarkXPress and InDesign for page layouting, QuarkCopyDesk, InCopy and an Internet Browser for editing, copyfitting and reviewing text and Adobe Photoshop, Microsoft Word etc. for content editing. In 2009, Quark, Inc. in association with Stepnet Ingénierie, a French software editor, developed a java based framework which gave web services to almost all QPS features and some of QuarkXPress' ones, such as editing rich text, cropping high resolution pictures or generate PDF/X  from standard QuarkXPress files within a QPS secured workflow. This framework supported the latest release of QPS and was available as an option, called QPS Web Portal.

Core modules included in QPS Classic
 QuarkDispatch
 QuarkDispatch Administrator
 QuarkDispatch Manager
 QuarkDispatch XTensions module
 QuarkCopyDesk
 QuarkConnect
 Quark License Administrator (QLA)
 QuarkXPress

Core modules included/supported in QPS 8
 QPS Server
 QPS Connect Client
 QPS XTensions module for QuarkXPres
 QPS XTensions module for QuarkCopyDesk
 QPS WebHub
 QuarkCopyDesk
 QuarkXPress
 QuarkXPress Server
 Quark License Administrator (QLA)
 QPS Web Portal
 Adobe InDesign
 Adobe InCopy

History
 QPS 1.0 (1991): Support for QuarkXPress 3.1, Clients and Server only Mac-based
 QPS 1.1 (1996): Support for QuarkXPress 3.3
 QPS 2.0 (1998): Support for QuarkXPress 4, Clients also Windows-based
 QPS 2.2 (2003): Support for QuarkXPress 5, first version to use TCP/IP as a communication method
 QPS 3.0 (2004): Support for QuarkXPress 6
 QPS 3.5 (2005): Support for QuarkXPress 6.5
 QPS 3.6 (2007): Server Java-based, so also available for Windows.
 QPS 7 (2007): Support for QuarkXPress 7, Server switched to a service-based architecture. Additional web editor to edit copy within a web browser.
 QPS 7.4 (2008): Support for Mac OS X Leopard, Web Editor transforms to Web Hub with more functionalities using the Web browser
 QPS 8 (2008): Support for Adobe InDesign & Adobe InCopy, support for QuarkXPress 8 and Quark CopyDesk 8
 QPS 8.1.6 (2009): Added Automation Services as a standard module of QPS
 QPS 8.5 (2010): Major overhaul of QPS to include features like collections, asset type based workflows, SharePoint adapter, App Studio
 QPS 9 (2011): Support for QuarkXPress 9, Web Support for bullets and numbering, conditional styles
 QPS 9 (2011): Support for QuarkXPress 9, Web Support for bullets and numbering, conditional styles

 Quark announces Quark Publishing Platform as a replacement for QPS (2012)

References

Desktop publishing software